Senator Solon may refer to:

Sam Solon (1931–2001), Minnesota State Senate
Yvonne Prettner Solon (born 1946), Minnesota State Senate